Paterek  is a village in the administrative district of Gmina Nakło nad Notecią, within Nakło County, Kuyavian-Pomeranian Voivodeship, in north-central Poland.

The village has a population of 2,300.

History
The oldest known mention of Paterek dates back to a 1720 document of Polish King Augustus II the Strong.

References

Villages in Nakło County
Nazi war crimes in Poland